The 2023 Hostplus Cup will be the PNG Hunters' tenth season in rugby league's Queensland Cup. The Papua New Guinea Hunters is a professional rugby league club from Papua New Guinea.

Train and trial partnership with Dolphins (NRL) 

The PNG Hunters strategic partnership with Dolphins (NRL)  saw three Hunters players Sherwin Tanabi, Rodrick Tai and Judah Rimbu training with the Dolphins (NRL) side during NRL pre-season in January,2023.

Season summary 
 Round 1:

Milestone games

2023 squad

Squad movement

Gains

Losses

Ladder 

 The team highlighted in blue has clinched the minor premiership
 Teams highlighted in green have qualified for the finals
 The team highlighted in red has clinched the wooden spoon

Fixtures

Pre-season

Regular season

Statistics

References

2023 in rugby league

2023 in Australian rugby league
Queensland Cup
2023 in rugby league by club